Christian Scarlato (born 24 August 1983) is a former Italian professional footballer who plays for Marino in Eccellenza (amateur league).

He played in the Serie B for Salernitana and for the Italian national youth teams.

Biography
He joined Teramo on 16 July 2003 along with Attilio Nicodemo and Jacopo Mariscoli. After several loan, he joined Acireale in co-ownership deal in 2005, valued a nominal fee of €500. Since 2008–09 season he played in Serie D and Eccellenza Lazio teams (non-professional leagues). He joined hometown club Formia in October 2010. In December, he joined Marino.

He also signed by Serie B team Grosseto on 10 August 2009 but later released along with Gianluca Toscano.

International career
He capped for Italy youth teams in friendly matches. He capped for Italy under-15 team, at that time the feeder team of Italy U-16 team (UEFA changed the name of the event from U-16 to U-17 in 2001). He also played for U-17 team (feeder team of Italy U-18 team, after 2001 renamed to U-19 team) and U-20 team (feeder team of U-21 team) in various tournament, likes in the Four Nations Tournament.

Honours
Serie D: 2010 (Pisa)

References

External links
 
 Serie D career at LaSerieD.com 
 FIGC 

1983 births
Living people
Italian footballers
A.S. Roma players
A.C. Prato players
S.S. Teramo Calcio players
F.C. Grosseto S.S.D. players
U.S. Salernitana 1919 players
Fermana F.C. players
Manfredonia Calcio players
Giulianova Calcio players
Pisa S.C. players
A.S.D. Città di Marino Calcio players
Serie B players
Association football midfielders